Richard Joseph Libertini (May 21, 1933 – January 7, 2016) was an American stage, film and television actor.

He was known for playing character roles and his ability to speak in numerous accents. His films include Catch-22 (1970), The In-Laws (1979), Popeye (1980), All of Me (1984), Fletch (1985), Fletch Lives (1989), Awakenings (1990), Lethal Weapon 4 (1998), and Dolphin Tale (2011).

Early life 
Libertini was born in Cambridge, Massachusetts, and graduated from Emerson College in Boston. During his early years, Libertini worked in New York City and in Chicago. He moved to Los Angeles to pursue his acting career during the 1960s.

Career 
He was an original cast member of The Mad Show, a 1966 Off-Broadway musical-comedy produced by Mad magazine. His first film appearances were in The Night They Raided Minsky's (1968), Don't Drink the Water (1969) and Catch-22 (1970).

Two of his more memorable film roles came in the comedies Fletch (1985), in which he played Chevy Chase's character's doubting editor, a role he repeated in the 1989 sequel Fletch Lives, and The In-Laws (1979), in which he played General Garcia, an insane Latin American dictator whose closest advisor was a cartoon face drawn on his own hand a la Señor Wences. He portrayed Nosh, an electronics expert who is the childhood best friend of Burt Reynolds's character, in Sharky's Machine (1981).

He also played a traveling vaudevillian in Terrence Malick's Days of Heaven (1978), the greengrocer George W. Geezil in Robert Altman's Popeye (1980), a Hispanic priest in Best Friends (1982), the servant Giuseppe in Unfaithfully Yours (1984), spiritual advisor Prahka Lasa ("Back in Bowl!") in All of Me (1984), the bandit Dijon in Disney's animated feature film DuckTales the Movie: Treasure of the Lost Lamp (1990),  and a rabbi in Lethal Weapon 4 (1998).

On television, Libertini was a series regular in the first season of Soap as the Godfather. He appeared as three different characters in episodes of Barney Miller. He also appeared in "Evaluation" (1978) and "Middle Age" (January 1979). He guest starred in the Star Trek: Deep Space Nine episode "Accession" as a Bajoran named Akorem Laan, and in the Sonny with a Chance episode "Dakota's Revenge" as Izzy, an insane mechanic. He also voiced Wally Llama on Animaniacs, and starred in three short-lived sitcoms: Family Man (1988), in which he played a middle-aged comedy writer who married a much younger woman and became a father late in life; The Fanelli Boys (1990–1991), in which he played an Italian priest; and Pacific Station (1991–1992), in which he played a police detective.

Libertini appeared on the TV show Supernatural. His final film role was that of a fisherman in the 2011 film Dolphin Tale. From October 2011 through January 2012, Libertini appeared on Broadway as a rabbi in "Honeymoon Motel," the Woody Allen-penned segment of Relatively Speaking.

Personal life 
Libertini married actress Melinda Dillon on September 30, 1963; he had one child with her, Richard. They divorced in 1978.

Libertini died at the age of 82 in Venice, California, on January 7, 2016, from cancer. He had been diagnosed two years prior.

Selected filmography 

 The Night They Raided Minsky's (1968) - Pockets 
 Don't Drink the Water (1969) - Father Drobney
 The Out-of-Towners (1970) - Baggage Man - Boston
 Catch-22 (1970) - Brother John
 Lady Liberty (1971) - Tim (uncredited)
 I Wonder Who's Killing Her Now? (1975) - Cafe Waiter / Jack Kirsten
 Fire Sale (1977) - Painter
 Days of Heaven (1978) - Vaudeville Leader
 The In-Laws (1979) - Gen. Garcia
 Popeye (1980) - Geezil
 Sharky's Machine (1981) - Nosh
 Soup for One (1982) - Angelo
 Best Friends (1982) - Jorge Medina
 Going Berserk (1983) - Rev. Sun Yi Day
 Deal of the Century (1983) - Masaggi
 Unfaithfully Yours (1984) - Giuseppe
 All of Me (1984) - Prahka Lasa
 Fletch (1985) - Frank Walker
 Big Trouble (1986) - Dr. Lopez
 Betrayed (1988) - Sam Kraus
 Fletch Lives (1989) - Frank Walker
 Animal Behavior (1989) - Doctor Parrish
 The Lemon Sisters (1990) - Nicholas Panas
 DuckTales the Movie: Treasure of the Lost Lamp (1990) - Dijon (voice)
 Awakenings (1990) - Sidney
 The Bonfire of the Vanities (1990) - Ed Rifkin
 Nell (1994) - Alexander Paley
 Cultivating Charlie (1994) - Glosser
 Lethal Weapon 4 (1998) - Rabbi Gelb (uncredited)
 Telling You (1998) - Mr. P
 The 4th Tenor (2002) - Vincenzo
 Grilled (2006) - Rabbi Silver
 Everybody Wants to Be Italian (2007) - Papa Aldo Tempesti
 A Grandpa for Christmas (2007) - Karl Sugarman
 Dolphin Tale (2011) - Fisherman
 How to Become an Outlaw (2014) - Judge

References

External links 
 

1933 births
2016 deaths
20th-century American male actors
21st-century American male actors
American male film actors
American male stage actors
American male television actors
American male voice actors
American people of Italian descent
Deaths from cancer in California
Emerson College alumni
Male actors from Cambridge, Massachusetts